The 1998 SWAC men's basketball tournament was held March 5–7, 1998, at the Reunion Arena in Dallas, Texas.  defeated , 59–57 in the championship game to win the school's first SWAC Tournament title. The Panthers received the conference's automatic bid to the 1998 NCAA tournament as No. 16 seed in the Midwest Region.

Bracket and results

References

1997–98 Southwestern Athletic Conference men's basketball season
SWAC men's basketball tournament